Nabak Rural LLG is a local-level government (LLG) of Morobe Province, Papua New Guinea. The Nabak language is spoken in the LLG.

Wards
01. Satukimo
02. Yaquamu
03. Awen
04. Baindoang
05. Kwambelem
06. Kasanombe
07. Karangandoang
08. Kemen (Duwet language speakers)
09. Momsalop
10. Gwabadik
11. Gawam
12. Samanzing
13. Hobu
14. Sambuen

References

Local-level governments of Morobe Province